"It's Too Late" is the lead single by rock band, Evermore, taken from their debut album Dreams (September 2004). The track was written by the group's three New Zealand-raised brothers: Dann (backing vocals, drums), Jon (lead vocals, lead guitar), and Peter Hume (backing vocals, piano, keyboards, bass guitar). It was produced by John Alagía and released on 2 August 2004, which reached No. 16 on the ARIA Singles Chart in their adopted country of Australia. The song features on The OC Mix 2 soundtrack as a bonus Australian release only track. It also features on the Australian and New Zealand editions of SingStar Pop. In Australia, the song was listed at No. 14 on Triple J's Hottest 100 of 2004.

An alternate version, the Dirty South Remix, "It's Too Late (Ride On)", was issued as a single on 7 August 2006. It reached the top 100 in Belgium, France, and the Netherlands.

Background
"It's Too Late" is the lead single from Evermore's debut album, Dreams (September 2004), which peaked at No. 16 on the ARIA Singles Chart. The group consists of three New Zealand-raised brothers, Jon (lead vocals, lead guitar), Peter (backing vocals, piano, keyboards, bass guitar), and Dann Hume (backing vocals, drums) – they co-wrote "It's Too Late". Evermore worked with producers Barrett Jones (Nirvana, Foo Fighters, Whiskeytown) and (Dave Matthews Band, John Mayer).

Two more singles were released from the album: "For One Day" (February 2005), and "Come to Nothing" (May) – which charted in the top 100. All three singles were featured on the New Zealand and Australian promos for the United States TV program, The O.C., with "It's Too Late" ultimately appearing on the show.

Track listing

Charts

Weekly charts

Year-end charts

Release history

"It's Too Late (Ride On)"

On 7 August 2006, a remixed version of "It's Too Late" by Dirty South (aka Dragan Roganović), titled "It's Too Late (Ride on)", was released. The remixed single reached the top 100 in Belgium, France and the Netherlands.

Track listing

References

Evermore (band) songs
2006 singles
2004 singles
East West Records singles
2004 songs
Songs written by Dann Hume
Songs written by Jon Hume